Vairamuthu is an Indian lyricist, poet, and novelist working in the Tamil film industry. A master's graduate from the Pachaiyappa's College in Chennai, he first worked as a translator, while also being a published poet. He entered the Tamil film industry in the year 1980, with the film Nizhalgal, an Ilaiyaraaja musical, directed by Bharathiraja. During the course of his 40-year film career, he has written over 7,500 songs and poems which have won him seven National Awards, the most for any Indian lyricist. He has also been honored with a Padma Shri, a Padma Bhushan and a Sahitya Akademi Award, for his abundant literary output.

His association With A. R. Rahman is notable. Their association has won four out of six National Awards for A. R. Rahman and four out of seven National Awards for Vairamuthu. His association with filmmaker Mani Ratnam is also very well known and highly successful. The trio (A. R. Rahman, Vairamuthu, Mani Ratnam) completed 25 years of their successful association in 2017.

Filmography

Lyricist
Films

 1980 Kaali
 1980 Nizhalgal
 1981 Alaigal Oivathillai
 1981 Tik Tik Tik
 1981 Raja Paarvai
 1981 Vaa Intha Pakkam
 1981 Sivappu Malli
 1982 Ninaivellam Nithya
 1982 Kadhal Oviyam
 1982 Puthu Kavithai
 1982 Eera Vizhi Kaaviyangal
 1982 Thooral Ninnu Pochchu
 1982 Moondram Pirai
 1983 Aanandha Kummi
 1983 Salangai Oli
 1983 Mann Vasanai
 1984 Nallavanukku Nallavan
 1984 Enakkul Oruvan
 1984 Pudhumai Penn
 1985 Thendrale Ennai Thodu
 1985 Poi Mugangal
 1985 Padikkadavan
 1985 Poove Poochooda Vaa
 1985 Idaya Kovil
 1985 Mudhal Mariyathai
 1985 Naan Sigappu Manithan
 1985 Sindhu Bhairavi
 1986 Neethana Antha Kuyil
 1986 Kadalora Kavithaigal
 1986 Vikram
 1986 Punnagai Mannan
 1986 Samsaram Adhu Minsaram
 1987 Shankar Guru
 1987 Vedham Pudhithu
 1987 Chinna Thambi Periya Thambi
 1987 Vilangu
 1987 Manithan
 1987 Paruva Ragam
 1988 Padum Paravaigal
 1988 Thaimel Aanai
 1988 Kodi Parakuthu
 1989 Raja Chinna Roja
 1989 Sonthakkaran
 1990 Idhaya Thamarai
 1991 Agaram
 1992 Thalaivasal
 1992 Roja
 1992 Sevagan
 1992 Annamalai
 1993 Captain Magal
 1993 Pratap
 1993 Thiruda Thiruda
 1993 Vedan
 1993 Kizhakku Cheemayile
 1993 Gentleman
 1993 Amaravathi
 1993 Pudhiya Mugam
 1994 Nattamai
 1994 Mani Rathnam
 1994 Jai Hind
 1994 Pavithra
 1994 Sindhu Nathi Poo
 1994 Captain
 1994 Raja Pandi
 1994 Vandicholai Chinraasu
 1994 Kadhalan
 1994 Duet
 1994 Karuthamma
 1994 May Madham
 1994 Seevalaperi Pandi
 1995 Basha
 1995 Bombay
 1995 Pasumpon
 1995 Indira
 1995 Aasai
 1995 Karnaa
 1995 Rangeela (dubbed version)
 1995 Muthu
 1996 Panchalankurichi
 1996 Indian
 1996 Love Birds
 1996 Kaalam Maari Pochu
 1996 Mr. Romeo
 1997 Iruvar
 1997 Minsara Kanavu
 1997 Arunachalam
 1997 Gopura Deepam
 1997 Ettupatti Rasa
 1997 Bharathi Kannamma
 1997 Love Today
 1997 Once More
 1997 Nerrukku Ner
 1997 V.I.P
 1997 Ratchagan
 1997 Anthimanthaarai
 1997 Porkkaalam
 1998 Sandhippoma
 1998 Kaadhal Mannan
 1998 Thaayin Manikodi
 1998 Jeans
 1998 Nilaave Vaa
 1998 Uyire.. (Dubbed version)
 1998 Uyirodu Uyiraga
 1998 Kannedhirey Thondrinal
 1998 Unnudan
 1999 Thulladha Manamum Thullum
 1999 Vaali
 1999 Rojavanam
 1999 Amarkalam
 1999 Endrendrum Kadhal
 1999 Kanave Kalaiyadhe
 1999 Sangamam
 1999 Thaalam (dubbed version)
 1999 Mudhalvan
 1999 Thulladha Manamum Thullum
 1999 Jodicon mr 
 1999 En Swasa Kaatre
 1999 Padayappa
 1999 Ethirum Pudhirum
 1999 Iraniyan (film) 
 1999 Vallarasu
 1999 Aasaiyil Oru Kaditham
 1999 Anantha Poongatre
 1999 Hello
 1999 Taj Mahal
 2000 Alaipayuthey
 2000 Kushi
 2000 Sandhitha Velai
 2000 Vetri Kodi Kattu
 2000 Doubles
 2000 Rhythm
 2000 Good Luck
 2000 Uyirile Kalanthathu
 2000 Kandukondain Kandukondain
 2000 Parthen Rasithen
 2000 Snegithiye
 2000 Vaanavil
 2000 Pennin Manathai Thottu
 2000 Appu
 2000 Mugavaree
 2000 Ennavale
 2001 Star
 2001 Cittizen
 2001 Pandavar Bhoomi
 2001 Poovellam Un Vaasam
 2001 Vedham
 2001 Shahjahan
 2001 12B
 2001 Little John
 2001 Aalavandhan
 2001 Paarthale Paravasam
 2001 Majunu
 2002 King
 2002 Kannathil Muthamittal 
 2002 Thamizhan
 2002 Baba
 2002 Alli Arjuna
 2002 Red
 2002 Thamizhan
 2002 Virumbugiren
 2002 Gemini
 2002 Roja Kootam
 2002 Panchathanthiram
 2002 Samurai
 2002 Youth
 2002 Villain
 2003 Anbe Sivam
 2003 Iyarkai
 2003 Aasai Aasaiyai
 2003 Kadhal Sadugudu
 2003 Jay Jay
 2003 Sindhamal Sitharamal
 2003 Anjaneya
 2003 Parasuram
 2004 Kangalal Kadhu Sei
 2004 Arul
 2004 Aaytha Ezhuthu
 2004 New
 2004 Vasool Raja MBBS
 2004 Chellamae
 2004 Attagasam
 2005 Mannin Maindhan
 2005 Kana Kandaen
 2005 Ullam Ketkumae
 2005 Anniyan
 2006 Thiruvilaiyaadal Aarambam
 2006 Paramasivan
 2006 Dishyum
 2006 Thambi
 2006 Varalaru: The History of Godfather
 2006 Poi
 2007 Guru (Dubbed version)
 2007 Mozhi
 2007 Pirappu
 2007 Sivaji
 2008 Dasavathaaram
 2008 Pournami
 2008 Kannum Kannum
 2008 Abhiyum Naanum
 2009 Ayan
 2009 Irumbu Kottai Murattu Singam
 2009 Peranmai
 2010 Moscowin Kaveri
 2010 Sivappu Mazhai
 2010 Raavanan
 2010 Enthiran
 2010 Thenmerku Paruvakaatru
 2010 Aasal
 2011 Thambi Vettothi Sundaram
 2011 Vaagai Sooda Vaa
 2012 Neerparavai
 2012 Yamuna
 2013 Vishwaroopam
 2013 Paradesi
 2013 Irandaam Ulagam
 2013 Kutty Puli
 2013 Ragalaipuram
 2013 Kadal
 2013 Pandiya Naadu
 2013 Naveena Saraswathi Sabatham
 2014 Jilla
 2014 Panivizhum Malarvanam
 2014 Kerala Nattilam Pengaludane
 2014 Kochadaiiyaan
 2014 Jeeva
 2014 Lingaa
 2014 Vellaikaara Durai
 2014 Nannbenda
 2015 Karma
 2015 Agathinai
 2015 Anegan
 2015 O Kadhal Kanmani
 2015 Puli
 2015 Paayum Puli
 2015 Thoongaa Vanam
 2016 24
 2016 Marudhu
 2016 Wagah
 2016 Dharmadurai
 2017 Bairavaa
 2017 Kaatru Veliyidai
 2017 Anbanavan Asaradhavan Adangadhavan
 2017 Sakka Podu Podu Raja
 2018 Chekka Chivantha Vaanam
 2018 Vishwaroopam II
 2018 Kanne Kalaimaane
 2019 Kaappaan
 2022 The Legend

 
Television

 1990 Rail Sneham
 1991 Naanayam I 
 1995 Kaiyalavu Nesam
 1997 Aachi International
 1997 Nimmathi Ungal Choice I
 1998 Velai
 1998 Nimmathi Ungal Choice II — Kannammavin Kadhai
 1998 Oru Pennin Kathai
 1999 Chithi
 1999 Kokila Enge Pogiraal
 1999 Galatta Kudumbam I
 1999 Sontham
 1999 Nimmathi Ungal Choice III — Thriveni Sangamam
 1999 Nimmathi Ungal Choice IV — Mavilai Thoranam
 2000 Vaazhkkai
 2000 Gopi
 2000 Nimmathi Ungal Choice V — Manasatchi
 2001 Vaazhnthu Kaattukiren
 2001 Take It Easy Vaazhkai
 2000 Nambikkai
 2001 Kaveri
 2001 Alaigal
 2002 Aasai
 2002 Annamalai
 2002 Indira
 2002 Metti Oli
 2003 Parasuram
 2004 Ahalya
 2005 Aarthi
 2005 Sruthi
 2006 Bhandham
 2006 Penn
 2006 Anjali
 2007 Vairanenjam
 2007 Paasam
 2007 Naanayam II 
 2008 Simran Thirai
 2008 Savale Samali
 2008 Gokulathil Seethai
 2008 Samsaram
 2009 Dhaayam
 2009 Uravugal
 2009 Aval Oru Minsaram
 2009 Vilakku Vacha Nerathula
 2010 Nadhaswaram
 2010 Mundhanai Mudichu
 2011 Uravukku Kai Koduppom
 2011 Muthaaram
 2012 Bommalattam
 2012 Vairakkiyam
 2012 Thyagam
 2014 Mohini
 2014 Kalyana Parisu
 2017 Vidhi

Dialogue writer
Aanandha Kummi (1983)
Natpu (1986)
Odangal (1986)
Raaga Devathai (1987)
Vanna Kanavugal (1987)
Thulasi (1987)
Idhaya Geetham (1990)
Vanakkam Vathiyare (1991)
Captain (1994).

Onscreen appearances
Adutha Veedu (1986) - guest role in song "Purushan Manaivi Uravuthan"
Jodi (1999)

List of songs

References

Indian filmographies
Discographies of Indian artists